Ike Franklin Andrews (September 2, 1925 – May 10, 2010) was an American politician. He served as a Democratic U.S. Congressman from North Carolina's Fourth Congressional District between 1973 and 1985, when he was defeated for reelection by Republican Bill Cobey.

Biography
Born in Bonlee, North Carolina, Andrews attended local public schools and the Fork Union Military Academy. After his graduation in 1942, he served in the United States Army during World War II as a field artillery forward observer, between 1943 and 1945. During his military service, he attained the rank of Master Sergeant, received the Bronze Star and Purple Heart.

After the war, Andrews studied at the University of North Carolina at Chapel Hill, earning his bachelor's degree in 1950 and a law degree in 1952. He practiced law in Pittsboro, North Carolina, and was elected to the North Carolina State Senate in 1959. Andrews was later elected to the North Carolina House of Representatives in 1961, 1967, 1969, and 1971. In 1972, Andrews was elected to his first of six terms in the U.S. House. A Democrat, he served from January 3, 1973, to January 3, 1985, before being defeated for re-election in 1984. North Carolina House Speaker Joe Hackney was at one time his son-in-law, and also served as his 1974 campaign manager.

References

 News & Observer: Former Congressman Ike Andrews has died, May 10, 2010

|-

|-

|-

1925 births
2010 deaths
University of North Carolina School of Law alumni
Democratic Party North Carolina state senators
Democratic Party members of the North Carolina House of Representatives
North Carolina lawyers
United States Army personnel of World War II
United States Army non-commissioned officers
Democratic Party members of the United States House of Representatives from North Carolina
20th-century American politicians
20th-century American lawyers